The National Stallion Stakes was an American Thoroughbred horse race for two-year-old fillies held annually for the twenty-four years between 1948 through 1971. It was created as a counterpart to the National Stallion Stakes which was first run in 1898 at Morris Park Racecourse and was open to horses of either sex until 1948 when it became a race exclusively for colts and geldings. Contested on dirt at a distance of five and one-half furlongs, the filly division was hosted by Belmont Park in Elmont, New York except for 1963 through 1967 when it was run at Aqueduct Racetrack in South Ozone Park, Queens, New York.

The race was restricted to fillies whose sire had been nominated for the race by its owner before the end of the foal's birth year.

Historical notes
The inaugural running of the fillies division took place on June 5, 1948. It was won by Green Baize owned by Walter M. Jeffords Sr. and ridden by future Hall of Fame jockey Eddie Arcaro.

Bowl of Flowers won the 1960 edition while setting a new track record of 1:04 1/5 for five and one-half furlongs on dirt.

Filly winners 1898–1947
In what would be the last year for racing at Morris Park Racecourse, in 1904 Tanya became the first filly to win the National Stallion Stakes during the time it was open to horses of either sex. Tanya went on to become just the second filly to ever win the Belmont Stakes, an American Classic that would eventually be the third leg of the U.S. Triple Crown series. It would be thirty-four years until another filly was victorious in the National Stallion Stakes when New York City restaurateur Henry Lustig's Donita M won the 1938 race. Five years later Henry Lustig would own the third filly to capture the race when in 1943 his Mrs. Ames defeated the gelding Stir Up owned by the powerful Greentree Stable. Sonny Whitney's Enfilade in 1945 was the last filly to win the National Stallion Stakes before the separate division was created.

Owners who won both divisions in the same year
1961: Christopher Chenery's Meadow Stable won the filly division with their future Hall of Fame inductee Cicada and the colts division with Sir Gaylord.

1964: Wheatley Stable, owned by Gladys Mills Phipps and her brother Ogden L. Mills, won the colts division with Bold Lad and the filly division with Queen Empress.

1971: Calumet Farm won the filly division with Rondeau and the colt division with Plum Bold in what would prove to be the final running of the National Stallion races.

Records
Speed record:
 1:04.20 @ 5.5 furlongs: Gallant Bloom & Box The Compass (1968)
 0:56.40 @ 5 furlongs: Poly Hi (1957)

Most wins by a jockey:
 3 – Eric Guerin (1949, 1952, 1957, 1959)

Most wins by a trainer:
 4 – William C. Winfrey (1949, 1952, 1963, 1964)

Most wins by an owner:
 4 – Wheatley Stable (1954, 1958, 1963, 1964)

Winners

References

Flat horse races for two-year-old fillies
Discontinued horse races in New York (state)
Belmont Park
Aqueduct Racetrack
Recurring sporting events established in 1901
Recurring sporting events disestablished in 1909